Terry Hughes (born 7 March 1964 in Christchurch, New Zealand) is a former weightlifting competitor for New Zealand.

At the 2002 Commonwealth Games in Manchester he won two bronze medals in the 62 kg Clean and jerk and the 62 kg combined total.

References

Living people
1964 births
New Zealand male weightlifters
Commonwealth Games bronze medallists for New Zealand
Weightlifters at the 2002 Commonwealth Games
Commonwealth Games medallists in weightlifting
20th-century New Zealand people
21st-century New Zealand people
Medallists at the 2002 Commonwealth Games